Mattia Zennaro (born 3 August 2000) is an Italian football player who plays as a midfielder for  club Feralpisalò, on loan from Genoa.

Club career
He is a Venice native and was raised in the youth teams of Venezia. In October 2018 he signed a professional contract with the club until 2023.

He made his Serie B debut for Venezia on 26 October 2018 in a game against Palermo, as a 79th-minute substitute for Sergiu Suciu.

On 31 January 2019, he signed with Serie A club Genoa, who loaned him back to Venezia until the end of the 2018–19 season.

On 14 January 2021, he joined Serie C club Lucchese on loan.

On 31 July 2021, he was loaned to Serie C club Pergolettese.

On 7 July 2022, Zennaro joined Feralpisalò on loan with an option to buy.

International career
He was first called up to represent his country on 16 January 2019 with Italy national under-19 football team in a friendly against Spain. He scored a goal just one minute after coming on as a substitute in a 3–0 victory.

References

External links
 

2000 births
Living people
Footballers from Venice
Italian footballers
Association football midfielders
Serie B players
Serie C players
Venezia F.C. players
Genoa C.F.C. players
S.S.D. Lucchese 1905 players
U.S. Pergolettese 1932 players
FeralpiSalò players
Italy youth international footballers